Federico De Roberto (16 January 1861 – 26 July 1927) was an Italian writer, who became well known for his historical novel  (1894), translated as The Viceroys.

Biography
De Roberto was born in Naples and began his writing career as a journalist for national newspapers, where he met Giovanni Verga and Luigi Capuana, the most prominent writers of the Verismo movement. Verga introduced him into the literary circles of Milan. De Roberto authored two books of short stories:  (1887),  (1888). His first novel, (1889) is largely autobiographical; deeper in psychological analysis is the second,  (1891). In 1894 his novel  was published. It was the result of years of hard work, but obtained little success upon its release. He died in Catania at age 66.

I Viceré
The novel consists of three parts and is based upon the story of the fictional Uzeda princes of Francalanza, a noble family of Catania of Spanish origins. This family served as viceroys during the previous Spanish rule. The plot, focusing on the social and political background of the time, follows the private history of the Uzedas during the last year of Bourbon domination in the Kingdom of the Two Sicilies and the first decades of the Kingdom of Italy, portraying the transition from feudalism to a parliamentary system.

De Roberto uses the literary style of Verismo (the Italian expression of literary Naturalism) and adopts no privileged point of view (neither the narrator's nor any other's), but instead displays a plurality of voices. Mass scenes are present, as well as the detailed description of various social backgrounds. The primary aim of all members of the Uzeda family is to retain power regardless of the changes that occur, even if this requires actions that the reader will undoubtedly judge to be cynical or even absurd. De Roberto portrays a world undergoing fundamental change, but which seemingly holds no hope for the future: no aspect of society is represented as free from corruption.

The novel was adapted to cinema by director Roberto Faenza in 2007.

Works

Monographs 
  (essays, criticism)
  (posthumous publication)

The Uzeda Family chronicles 
 
  Published in English as 
  (posthumous publication)

Short story collections 
  (2nd edition) Milan: Libreria editrice Galli. 1892. (3rd edition) Milan: Fratelli Treves. 1910. (4th edition) Milan: Fratelli Treves. 1919.
  (2nd edition) Milan: Fratelli Treves. 1890 (4th edition) Milan: Libreria editrice Galli. 1896. (7th edition) Milan: Galli, Baldini & Castoldi. 1898.

Letters 
  Edited by Sarah Zappulla Muscarà. Catania: Tringale. 1978.
  Edited by Sarah Zappulla Muscarà. Rome: Bulzoni. 1979.
  Critical edition edited by Teresa Volpe. Rome: Aracne Editrice. 2013.

Poetry

Theatrical works 
  (1912)

Other writings 
 
  Edited by Niccolò Giannotta 1881. (Literary debut)
  Edited by Niccolò Giannotta. 1883. (Essays and criticism)
  (2nd edition) Milan: Baldini, Castoldi & C. 1902. (Revised edition) Milan; Rome: Mondadori. 1923. (Novel)
  (Essay)
  (Essay)
  (Serial publication) Published in English as 
 
 
 
 
 
 
 Catania 1907 Expo. Illustrated album compiled under the direction of Federico De Roberto. Catania: Galatola. 1908.
 
 
 
 
  (Stories)
 
 
  (Stories)
 
 
 
  (One-act play)
  Edited by Sarah Zappulla Muscarà. Rome: Curcio. 1979.
 
  (Various articles of literary and cultural criticism)
 
 
  Edited by Carlo A. Madrignani for the collection .

References

External links
 
 

19th-century Italian novelists
19th-century Italian male writers
20th-century Italian novelists
20th-century Italian male writers
1861 births
1927 deaths